Chikodili Emelumadu is a British and Nigerian speculative fiction writer.

Biography 
She was born in Worksop, Nottinghamshire and raised in Nigeria. Her short story "Candy Girl" was shortlisted for the Shirley Jackson Awards (2015). Her work has also been shortlisted for the Caine Prize for African Writing (2017 for "Bush Baby" and 2020 for "What to do when your child brings home a Mami Wata"), and a Nommo award (2020). In 2019, she won the inaugural Curtis Brown First Novel prize for her novel ‘Dazzling’. She also served as juror for the Shirley Jackson Awards in 2018 and 2020.

References 

Year of birth missing (living people)
Living people
21st-century British writers
21st-century Nigerian writers
Nigerian fantasy writers
21st-century British women writers
21st-century Nigerian women writers
Nommo Award winners